Jack Remy is a pornographic film director.

Awards
1995 AVN Award – Best Cinematography – Dog Walker
1999 AVN Award – Best Cinematography – Looker
1999 AVN Award – Best Videography – Cafe Flesh 2 (joint winner with Barry Wood's Forever Night)
2006 AVN Hall of Fame inductee

References

American pornographic film directors
Living people
Year of birth missing (living people)